Line 3 is a line on the Metrorrey system. The line opened on February 27, 2021.

History 
Construction for line 3 started in 2013. In early 2018, the state of Nuevo León signed a funding agreement to provide 600 million pesos to Metrorrey for continued construction on Line 3. Up to that period, Metrorrey reported total expenditures on Line 3 of over 10 billion pesos. The transit agency claims it spent these funds for viaducts, and station features, such as awnings, elevators, and escalators. By January 2020, construction for Line 3 was complete, according to the Secretaría de Comunicaciones y Transportes (SCT), the federal transportation agency. However, state government officials state that service is not available because the rolling stock has not been delivered. At that time, the estimated delivery for twenty-six rail cars was December 2020. The line is underground and elevated. Some of the 26 railcars arrived and passed on track testing as of August 2020, though not all of the railcars had arrived at that time.

Chronology
February 27, 2021: from Hospital Metropolitano to Zaragoza on Line 2

Station list

References

 
Underground rapid transit in Mexico
Electric railways in Mexico
Railway lines opened in 2021
2021 establishments in Mexico